The Church of Scientology Western United States (CoSWUS) is a Californian 501(c)(3) non-profit corporation, located in Los Angeles. CoSWUS is integrated within the ecclesiastical hierarchy of the Church of Scientology. The corporation is composed of several individual Scientology organizations and entities, among them churches, such as the "Church of Scientology of Los Angeles", which delivers services to public members of Scientology.

In its application for tax exemption, CoSWUS described the structure of the corporation as follows:

"The CSWUS corporation houses six distinct ecclesiastical organizations that includes three churches, each of which
ministers religious services at a different level of the religious hierarchy described above; two supervisory organizations and an ecclesiastical support organization. [...] Except for the Church of Scientology of San Diego, all of these church organizations are located in Los Angeles where they share a large complex of buildings and facilities. [...]"

The core of CoSWUS' organizations are located around L. Ron Hubbard Way in Hollywood, where three so-called "service organizations" are located: the already mentioned "Church of Scientology of Los Angeles", the "American Saint Hill Organization" (ASHO) and the "Advanced Organization Los Angeles" (AOLA). In this area is also the former "Cedars of Lebanon" Hospital located, which was purchased by the Church of Scientology during the 1970s and which serves today as a dormitory for the Scientology staff members, who work in the adjacent buildings or elsewhere in Los Angeles.

Corporate information

Basic information
On April 8, 1971, a new Scientology organization was incorporated in San Diego – the "Church of Scientology of Jolla". Its name was later changed to "Church of Scientology of San Diego". Finally, on May 20, 1985, the organization was transferred and re-incorporated in Los Angeles under the new name "Church of Scientology Western United States". The board of directors of the newly named corporation had adopted the organization's new bylaws on May 19, 1985.

At present the official address of CoSWUS is 1308 L. Ron Hubbard Way, Los Angeles CA 90027.

In 1993, the Church of Scientology International submitted to the Internal Revenue Service a list with all the corporate officers of the Scientology network. At this time, CoSWUS was officially managed by a board of trustees. Its members were Mariette Cynstein, Ivan Obolensky and Mary Pinat. The organization's board of directors was composed of Linda Sereda, Lawrence Lynn and Eugene Skonetski. The president of CoSWUS was Lawrence Lynn, with Linda Sereda as secretary and Eugene Skonetski as treasurer.

On August 18, 1993, CoSWUS filed an application for tax exemption under section 501(c)(3) of the Internal Revenue Code. In the same year, the Internal Revenue Service granted CoSWUS' request for exemption.

As of March 11, 2000 CoSWUS had the following corporate officers: Vicki Shantz (Chief Executive Officer/President), Wayne Carnahan (Secretary) and Vincenzo Contrafatto (Chief Financial Officer/Treasurer).

As of May 2, 2008, CoSWUS' official agent has been the attorney Jeanne Gavigan. Her official address is 6400 Canoga Park Avenue, Canoga Park, CA 91367.

Corporate activities
The Religious Technology Center (RTC) is the holder of Scientology's trademarks and service marks. As such, RTC entered with the CoSWUS on May 23, 1985, an organizational covenant, granting CoSWUS the right to sell and deliver the "Advanced Technology" to its public members while guaranteeing weekly payments of 6% of the monetary value of the "Advanced Technology"-services that are being delivered to the public from CoSWUS towards RTC.

The Church of Scientology International (CSI) presents itself as the mother church of the Church of Scientology worldwide. As such, it has the right to use and sub-license various Scientology trademarks and service marks. Consequently, CSI has entered a number of agreements with other subordinate organizations in the Scientology hierarchy, such as the CoSWUS:

 License Agreement. On June 15, 1982, CSI entered a license agreement with the "Church of Scientology of San Diego", which regulated the use of the service marks and trademarks by that organization. When this organization later became the "Church of Scientology Western United States", the license agreement remained valid for the newly renamed corporation.
 "Ecclesiastical Support Agreement". This agreement from January 1, 1992, acknowledges CSI's dominant role and control over all the functions and activities of CoSWUS and guarantees a steady, weekly payment of 12.5% of the organizations' net income towards CSI.
 "Motion Picture Exhibition Agreement." It guarantees CSI the weekly payment of 11% of the revenue by CoSWUS for their use of Scientology training courses. It also forces the organizations to use certain equipment, such as tape recorders, which CSI provides for the same use.

Organizational structure and management

According to its 1993 application for tax exemption, the corporation CoSWUS consisted at that time of six different sub-organizations or sub-entities:

"[...] 1. Church of Scientology Advanced Organization of Los Angeles ('AOLA') - AOLA is one of four advanced organizations in the world and the only one located in the United States. As an advanced organization AOLA is authorized to minister the Scientology advanced technology to the level of New OT V and religious training to the level of Class VIII auditor as well as most of the lower levels of auditing and religious training. [...] AOLA's activities consist of the ministry of religious services and administrative and executive functions necessary to support this ministry. AOLA's staff includes auditors, case supervisors, course supervisors and other staff directly involved in administering services, as well as executive and administrative staff [...]"

"[...] 2. American Saint Hill Organization ('ASHO') - ASHO is one of only four Saint Hill Organizations in the world [...], and the only Saint Hill Organization in the United States. Saint Hill Organizations are so named because they specialize in delivering the Saint Hill Special Briefing Course ('Briefing Coursel') and other Scientology religious services at a comparable level. The Briefing Course is a very extensive, advanced course in auditor training which includes a chronological study of the written and recorded Scientology Scriptures. ASHO also ministers other religious training and lower-level and intermediate level auditing. The religious services ministered by ASHO generally emphasize training. [...]"

"[...] 3. Church of Scientology of San Diego - Church of Scientology of San Diego is a Class V church of Scientology and is authorized to minister Scientology auditing to the State of Clear and auditor training to the level of Class V auditor. It is a local church of Scientology for the San Diego area."

"4. Continental Liaison Office West U.S. ('CLO WUS') - CLO WUS is an intermediate level ecclesiastical management organization which acts as a liaison for CSI. [...] CLO WUS administers Church programs and provides guidance and advice to Scientology churches in the Western United States. There are 30 separate churches under CLO WUS's ecclesiastical jurisdiction [...] CLO WUS reviews operations of the Scientology churches within its ecclesiastical jurisdiction and liaises with
CSI. [...]"

"[...] 5. Commodore's Messenger Organization Pacific ('CMO PAC') -  CMO PAC oversees the execution of programs from the Commodore's Messenger Organization International of CSI and acts as a liaison between CSWUS and CSI with respect to those programs."

"6. Pacific Base Crew ('PBC') - PBC is the organization responsible for maintaining the complex of Scientology buildings and other facilities used by CSWUS and other Scientology organizations in Los Angeles. PBC is responsible for renovations, some construction and most repairs to these facilities. Its staff also provides meals and berthing to the staff of all Scientology organizations located in the Scientology complex. [...]"

See also

Scientology
Dianetics
Church of Scientology
Religious Technology Center
Church of Scientology International
List of Scientology organizations

References

Scientology organizations
Religious organizations established in 1971
Organizations based in Los Angeles